Ivica Jurković (born March 26, 1973) is Slovenian former professional basketball player.

Professional career
Jurković played for Rogaška Donat, Union Olimpija, Türk Telekom, PAOK, Olympiacos, Lokomotiv Rostov, Kaveh Tehran, Kordestan and Šentjur.

Slovenian national team
Jurković was a member of the Slovenia national basketball team since 1996 until 2004.  He competed at Eurobasket 1997, Eurobasket 1999, Eurobasket 2001 and Eurobasket 2003. He represented Slovenia officially at 61 games and scored a  488 points.

Career statistics

Euroleague

|-
| style="text-align:left;"| 2004–05
| style="text-align:left;"| Olympiacos
| 10 || 10 || 25.4 || .472 || .148 || .667 || 4.8 || .9 || 1.0 || .3 || 5.4 || 4.9
|-
| style="text-align:left;"| 2006–07
| style="text-align:left;"| Union Olimpija
| 12 || 5 || 22.2 || .639 || .300 || .568 || 3.1 || .6|| 1.4 || .1 || 9.3 || 7.2
|-
| style="text-align:left;"| 2008–09
| style="text-align:left;"| Union Olimpija
| 4 || 0 || 11.6 || .000 || .286 || 1.000 || 1.8 || .3|| .3 || .3 || 2.0 || -1.0
|-

References

External links
 Euroleague Profile 
 Eurobasket.com Profile 
 Fiba Profile 
 Basketnews.lt Profile
 TBLStat.net Profile

1973 births
Living people
Croats of Bosnia and Herzegovina
Slovenian men's basketball players
KK Lokomotiva Mostar players
KK Olimpija players
Power forwards (basketball)
P.A.O.K. BC players
Olympiacos B.C. players
ABA League players
People from Čapljina